Sam Coppola (July 31, 1932 – February 5, 2012) was an American actor. He appeared in almost 70 films, beginning in 1968, but may be best remembered for his role as Dan Fusco, owner of the hardware and paint store in Saturday Night Fever, who gave John Travolta's character sage but salty advice in the classic 1977 film. Later in his career, Coppola made a brief but memorable appearance on The Sopranos as the idiosyncratic family therapist of Jennifer Melfi.

Coppola was a cop in Serpico (1973), starring Al Pacino, and a detective in Fatal Attraction (1987), starring Michael Douglas and Glenn Close. His many TV credits include The Practice, The Good Wife, Law & Order, The Sopranos, Ryan's Hope and the 2001 A&E movie The Big Heist, in which he portrayed mob boss Paul Castellano. Coppola played a nursing home resident in a Chevy commercial that aired during 2011's Super Bowl and a hot dog vendor in a Ball Park Franks spot starring Michael Jordan.

Coppola, a 38-year resident of Leonia, with no relation to film director Francis Ford Coppola, also had many stage roles. He played the hobo Vladimir in a 2005 off-Broadway production of Waiting for Godot and aging real estate salesman Aaronow in a 2000 production of Glengarry Glen Ross at the McCarter Theatre in Princeton.

Coppola died February 5, 2012, from an aneurysm.

Partial filmography

 No Way to Treat a Lady (1968) - Customer (uncredited)
 Interplay (1970) - Mel
 The Anderson Tapes (1971) - Private Detective
 The Gang That Couldn't Shoot Straight (1971) - Julie
 Serpico (1973) - Cop (uncredited)
 Crazy Joe (1974) - Chick
 Death Journey (1976) - Detective Johnson
 Saturday Night Fever (1977) - Dan Fusco
 Fingers (1978) - Sam
 King of the Gypsies (1978) - (uncredited)
 Without a Trace (1983) - Schoyer
 Fatal Attraction (1987) - Fuselli
 Zits (1988) - Principal
 Blue Steel (1989) - PBA Representative
 She's Back (1989) - Det. Brophy
 Street Hunter (1990) - Jannelli
 Jacob's Ladder (1990) - Taxi Driver
 A Kiss Before Dying (1991) - Detective Michaelson
 Joey Breaker (1993) - Sid Kramer
 Money for Nothing (1993) - Bartender Lindey
 Palookaville (1995) - Mr. Kott, Money Truck Driver
 The Deli (1997) - Mr. Bishop
 A Wake in Providence (1999) - Uncle Joe
 Blue Moon (2000) - Bill
 Sally (2000) - Dr. Felch
 Friends & Family (2001) - Carlo Ricci
 Empire (2002) - Bobby Gold
 Nola (2003) - Gus
 True Crime: New York City (2005) - Additional voices
 Heavy Petting (2007) - Old Codger #1
 House of Satisfaction (2008) - Barry
 Reunion (2009) - Max
 Run It (2009) - Vinny
 Driving Me Crazy (2012) - Larry Petterson

References

External links

Obituary

1932 births
2012 deaths
American male film actors
American male television actors
Male actors from Jersey City, New Jersey
People from Leonia, New Jersey
American people of Italian descent
20th-century American male actors
21st-century American male actors